Zaw Min was the Minister for Electric Power-1 of Myanmar (Burma). A retired Colonel in the Myanmar Army, he resigned his ministerial position 28 August 2012.

Shooting incidents in 1998
In May 1998, Colonel Zaw Min landed on Christie Island and found 59 people living there to gather wood and bamboo, in violation of Burmese law. Senior General Than Shwe ordered them to be "eliminated" and all were subsequently murdered by Zaw Min's soldiers. Several days later, the 22 man crew of a Thai fishing boat that strayed into Burmese waters were also executed and their bodies buried on Christie Island.

References

People from Bago Region
Government ministers of Myanmar
Burmese military personnel
1951 births
Living people
Union Solidarity and Development Party politicians
Specially Designated Nationals and Blocked Persons List
Individuals related to Myanmar sanctions